Julie-Anne Roth (born 31 March 1973) is a French actress. From 1996 to 1999 Roth studied at the CNSAD. She appeared in more than sixty films since 1989.

Selected filmography

References

External links 

1973 births
Living people
French film actresses